SuperMoney is an online financial comparison platform that helps consumers evaluate financial services. It is headquartered in Santa Ana, California.

History

SuperMoney was founded in 2013 by Miron Lulic and initially launched as a personal finance blog. The website's focus was transitioned to a Yelp-like model, to help users compare and review financial services.

In April 2017, SuperMoney launched its personal loan offer engine / marketplace which helped consumers submit a loan application and get back pre-approved loan offers from integrated lending partners.

In August 2017, SuperMoney launched an auto loan offer engine / marketplace that enabled consumers to have a similar experience for auto purchase and refinance loans.

In November 2018, SuperMoney launched a student loan refinancing offer engine / marketplace to help consumers get competing transparent offers from lenders who want to refinance their student loan debt.

In August 2021, Inc. Magazine announced SuperMoney placed #1706 on the 2021 Inc 5000 list of fastest growing private companies in America.  In August 2022, Inc. Magazine announced SuperMoney placed #1936 on the 2022 Inc 5000 list of fastest growing private companies in America.

Products and Services

SuperMoney Comparison Site
SuperMoney is not a direct supplier of financial services; it is instead a comparison platform. The company's goal is to provide a transparent data source for financial product information that helps consumers make informed financial decisions. Its comparison tools provide information on credit card selection, college loans, banking, mortgage loans, personal loans, auto loans, business loans, stock trading, insurance policies, and other financial services.

SuperMoney leverages its data to publish financial service industry studies that have been cited by media outlets such as CNBC, Business Insider, Forbes, Fox News and Reader's Digest.

SuperMoney Loan Offer Engine
SuperMoney launched its loan offer engine in 2017 and in 2018 announced it had processed over one billion dollars worth of financing requests. Less than a year later the firm announced it had doubled that volume to $2 billion worth and then to $5 billion within two years of that. The SuperMoney loan offer engine allows a consumer to fill out a financing request which is forwarded to matching lending partners, who return pre-approved offers in real time.

SuperMoney Point of Sale Lending Platform
SuperMoney launched its "No Fee Financing Platform" point of sale financing solution for small businesses in May 2018. The platform makes point of sale financing, in the form of point of sale loans, available to merchants and service providers across all industries including home improvement, health, and specialty retail. The platform is offered to merchants at no cost. SuperMoney generates revenue through its lending partners instead of charging merchants a discount rate fee to use the service.

References

External links

See also
 NerdWallet
 CreditKarma
 LendingTree

Companies based in Santa Ana, California
Financial services companies established in 2013
Online financial services companies of the United States
Internet properties established in 2013
Finance websites
Financial technology companies
Personal finance education